Bao'en Si or Bao'en Temple is the name of several notable temples:

 Bao'en Temple (Pingwu), in Pingwu, Sichuan.
 Bao'en Temple (Suzhou), in Suzhou, Jiangsu, which includes the Beisi Pagoda.
 The Porcelain Tower of Nanjing, which forms a part of the former Bao'en Temple of Nanjing
 Poh Ern Shih Temple in Singapore